Janet or Jan Thompson may refer to:
 Janet Thompson (figure skater) (born 1956), English ice dancer
 Janet Thompson (athlete), English discus athlete
 Janet Thompson (basketball) (1933–2014), American basketball player
 Jan Thompson (diplomat) (born 1965),  British diplomat
 Janet Thompson, a character in the film serial The Adventures of Smilin' Jack